Rayong Province Stadium or Rayong Province Central Stadium()  is a stadium in Rayong, Thailand.  It is currently used for football matches and is the home stadium of Rayong F.C. of the Thai League 2.  The stadium holds 7,500 spectators.

References

Football venues in Thailand
Buildings and structures in Rayong province